Samuel Mayer Russ Hammington (born 31 July 1977) is a New Zealand-born Australian comedian who is primarily active in South Korea. Hammington hosted radio show Drivetime with Annabelle Ambrose from 2008 to 2012. He was a cast member of popular reality-military show Real Men. He was also cast as a member of the popular KBS reality-variety show The Return of Superman with his two sons, William and Bentley Hammington.

Early life
Hammington was born on 31 July 1977 in Wellington, New Zealand, to Bruce William Hammington and casting director, Jan Russ. He is of English descent, tracing his ancestry back to Berkshire, England.

While studying a business degree in university, he decided he needed to take up Asian-language courses to help build up his resume. Due to the popularity of Japanese- and Chinese-language courses, he decided to study Korean. He studied Korean for 18 months before becoming a transfer student at Korea University in 2002.

Personal life
In October 2013, Hammington married Jeong Yu-mi, a Korean. They had two wedding ceremonies: a traditional Korean one in Korea and another in his home country, Australia, at Melbourne Zoo. They have two sons, William (정태오 : Jeong Tae-oh) Hammington (born 12 July 2016) and Bentley (정우성 : Jeong Woo-seong) Hammington (born 8 November 2017).

Filmography

TV shows

Film

Television shows

Awards

References

External links
 
 

1977 births
Living people
Australian male comedians
Australian male soap opera actors
Australian male voice actors
Australian male child actors
Australian television presenters
Australian radio presenters
Australian people of New Zealand descent
New Zealand people of Australian descent
People from Wellington City
Swinburne University of Technology alumni
Australian expatriates in South Korea
New Zealand people of English descent